Kari Michaelsen (born Kari Markussen, November 3, 1961) is an American actress, television personality, and motivational speaker. As an actress, she is best known for her role as Katie Kanisky on the sitcom Gimme a Break! (1981–1987).

Biography
Born in Manhattan, Michaelsen followed her parents into show business. Her father, Arne Markussen, is a singer. Her mother, Roberta Stevenson, was a dancer. She sang on the soundtrack for Sesame Street and was performing in Off-Broadway plays by age 11. In 1975, her family moved to Beverly Hills, and Michaelsen (who changed her name from Markussen) soon won guest spots on such shows as Diff'rent Strokes and Eight Is Enough. Her father is of Norwegian heritage.
 
She graduated from Beverly Hills High School in 1979 and studied at University of California, Los Angeles. She retired from television work in 2001. Kari has been doing public speaking and hosting educational seminars since 1990. She married David Waldock, a Mercedes-Benz executive, in July 2002. The couple had a son named Nickolas. Michaelsen and David Waldock were divorced in 2009.

Michaelsen dated pop star Andy Gibb in 1983.  Michaelsen is longtime friends with retired actress Kristy McNichol.

Filmography

Film

Television

Awards and nominations

References

External links
 

1961 births
Living people
20th-century American actresses
Actresses from New York City
American child actresses
American film actresses
American motivational speakers
Women motivational speakers
American people of Norwegian descent
American television actresses
People from Manhattan
University of California, Los Angeles alumni
21st-century American women